Hyposmocoma tantala is a species of moth of the family Cosmopterigidae. It is known only from Mount Tantalus on Oahu.

Adults were reared from case-making larvae collected on bark of a damp dead tree covered partially with lichen.

Etymology
The species is named tantala after Mount Tantalus, from where the type specimen was collected.

References

tantala
Endemic moths of Hawaii
Moths described in 2012